Griggs Street station (formerly Griggs Street/Long Avenue station) is a light rail station on the MBTA Green Line B branch, located between the southbound travel lanes and frontage road of Commonwealth Avenue at Griggs Street in Allston, Boston, Massachusetts.  The station is not accessible. It has two side platforms, located on the near sides of a pedestrian crossing, to serve the line's two tracks.

References

External links

MBTA - Griggs Street
Station from Google Maps Street View

Green Line (MBTA) stations
Railway stations in Boston